Akeem Ali Douglas Hayes (born July 26, 1992), professionally known as Guap aka Guapdad4000, is an American rapper, singer, and songwriter. He is also a member of the hip hop supergroup Zoink Gang, with JID, Smino, and Buddy. He released his first mixtape Scamboy Color on December 6, 2017. His debut studio album Dior Deposits was released on October 25, 2019.

Musical career
On December 6, 2017, he released his first mixtape Scamboy Color, which included production from Ducko McFli, IAMSU, and Guapdad himself, among others. In 2018, he made a guest appearance on fellow west coast rapper Buddy's album Harlan & Alondra on the song "Shameless".

On January 6, 2019, Hayes was invited to the Dreamville recording sessions for the compilation album Revenge of the Dreamers III. He was featured on the songs "Don't Hit Me Right Now", "Wells Fargo", and "Costa Rica". He talked about the recording sessions in an interview saying "[It was] Life-changing. The best musical learning experience ever."

Throughout 2018 and 2019, Guapdad 4000 released a handful of singles including "Flossin'", "Scammin", "First Things First", "Prada Process", and "Gucci Pajamas". On October 25, 2019, his debut album Dior Deposits was released, including features from Tory Lanez, 6lack, Chance the Rapper, G-Eazy and Buddy, among others.

In 2020, Hayes went on to work on a project that has a story and hidden clues of what this mysterious project is. He worked on the new project during quarantine, due to COVID-19. On April 24, 2020, he released the EP Platinum Falcon Tape, Vol. 1. On August 14, he released the sequel EP Platinum Falcon Returns, featuring guest appearances from Denzel Curry, Deante' Hitchcock, and Boogie.

On March 19, 2021, he released a collaboration album with !llmind titled 1176.

Artistry
In an interview with XXL, Hayes said he grew up listening to artists like Dom Kennedy, Mac Dre, Pharrell Williams, and Kanye West, saying "I take so much. I got so much from them. I like personalities because I got a big one." His vocals and style also get compared to Ma$e, Fabolous, and Cam'ron.

Discography

Studio albums

Extended plays

Mixtapes

Singles

As lead artist

As featured artist

Guest appearances

References

External links 

 Official website

Guapdad 4000
Guapdad 4000
Guapdad 4000
Guapdad 4000
Guapdad 4000
Guapdad 4000
Guapdad 4000
Guapdad 4000
Singer-songwriters from California
Warner Records artists